Pini Balili (born 18 June 1979) is an Israeli former football manager and former player. He was born in Jerusalem and is Jewish, of Turkish descent.

Career

Move back to Hapoel
As a youngster, Balili grew up supporting Hapoel Tel Aviv and was part of the youth system there before moving to Shimshon Tel Aviv in his teens. It wasn't long before he caught the eye of Hapoel scouts who saw Balili as a missed opportunity so the club purchased his contract after just one professional season. His breakout did not come until the Dror Kashtan era at Hapoel Tel Aviv. Instrumental in the club's success in the UEFA Cup, Balili found himself featuring for the national team as well. After the 2002–03 season, Hapoel decided to cut wages and Pini left for Turkish club Istanbulspor.

Time in Turkey
Balili's Turkish league debut was sensational; on 10 August 2003, he scored a beautiful chip as his team surprised city rivals Fenerbache 3–0. troubles at Istanbulspor led to Balili being let go after just one season. Though he immediately signed with newly promoted Kayserispor. In 2006, Sivasspor applied for Turkish citizenship for Balili stating that he is a model citizen in Turkey and has full grasp of the Turkish language.

A somewhat religious man, rumors were started that a league match between Sivasspor and Ankaraspor, was postponed during the 2006–07 on account of it coinciding with Yom Kippur. The Turkish Football Federation denied these claims. The story garnered some press coverage, namely because Israeli goalkeeper, Dudu Aouate claimed that he was willing to play on the Jewish day of atonement.

On 12 August 2007, Balili was viciously tackled by Trabzonspor's Egyptian defensive midfielder, Ayman Abdelaziz. Allegedly, Ayman swore at Balili in Arabic before the tackle and it caused the Sivasspor players to fight with the Trabzonspor players. A spectator then jumped onto the pitch and threw punches. Sivasspor players responded which led to a big fight on the field. Trabzonspor got punished for this incident.

Return to Israel
On 16 June 2010, Balili signed a two-year contract with Bnei Yehuda reuniting with his former coach Dror Kashtan.

On 17 October 2012, he moved to play for Maccabi Ironi Bat Yam in Liga Alef, there he played for two seasons until he retired from playing at the end of the 2013–14 season.

Managerial career
On 10 December 2012, Balili took over as the caretaker manager of Maccabi Ironi Bat Yam while still playing for them. The next season Balili worked as the assistant manager of Bat Yam until the club folded at the end of the 2013–14 season.

In the 2014–15 season, Balili worked as the manager of Maccabi Holon in the Ligat Nashim.

On 30 July 2015, Balili was appointed as the general manager of F.C. Shikun HaMizrah.

Honours
 
 Israeli Premier League: 1999–00
 Israel State Cup (2): 1999, 2000
 Toto Cup (1): 2001–02
 Süper Lig runner-up: 2008–09

See also
List of select Jewish football (association; soccer) players

Notes
 

Living people
1979 births
Israeli Jews
Israeli footballers
Israel international footballers
Shimshon Tel Aviv F.C. players
Hapoel Tel Aviv F.C. players
İstanbulspor footballers
Kayserispor footballers
Sivasspor footballers
Antalyaspor footballers
Bnei Yehuda Tel Aviv F.C. players
Maccabi Ironi Bat Yam F.C. players
Liga Leumit players
Israeli Premier League players
Süper Lig players
Israeli people of Turkish-Jewish descent
Expatriate footballers in Turkey
Israeli expatriate sportspeople in Turkey
Footballers from Jerusalem
Association football forwards